Nadim Barghouthi is a Palestinian footballer who plays his club football for Shabab Al-Khaleel. He is primarily used as a centre-back and was called up for Palestine's 2010 AFC Challenge Cup campaign where he made his debut replacing flu-stricken Mohammed Abdel-Jawad in the lineup.

References

External links

Palestinian footballers
Living people
1989 births
Footballers at the 2010 Asian Games

Association football defenders
Asian Games competitors for Palestine
Palestine international footballers